Stanislaus Cornelius Maria (Stan) Bentvelsen (Schipluiden, 6 May 1965) is a Dutch physicist. He is the director of Nikhef since 2014.

Bentvelsen studied Physics at the Universiteit van Amsterdam (UvA). In 1994 he completed his thesis at the UvA in 1994

From 1994 to 2000 he was a researcher at the CERN in Geneva.

From 2000 to 2005 Bentvelsen worked at the Nikhef (the Dutch National Institute for Subatomic Physics that performs research in particle physics and astroparticle physics). Since 2005 he teaches at the Universiteit van Amsterdam.

Since 2014 he is the director of the Nikhef. He succeeded professor Frank Linde on December 1, 2014.

References

External links
 KNAW: Stan Bentvelsen
 Nikhef: Stan Bentvelsen
 Stan Bentvelsen new director of Nikhef

Living people
1965 births
21st-century Dutch physicists

People associated with CERN